Man Alive! is a 1952 American animated short documentary film directed by William T. Hurtz. It was nominated for an Academy Award for Best Documentary Short.

Summary

In this animated cartoon, an analogy is made between a badly functioning car and a man with physical symptoms that could lead to neoplasm. Various stages of denial, unprofessional advice and quick fix remedies are shown (alongside the seven danger signals of cancer, recommendation of cancer therapies and debunked cancer myths). He finally goes to a good garage paying heavily to have it repaired, learning that he shouldn't make the same mistake with his body. He goes to the doctor for his indigestion (one of the symptoms of cancer).

See also
Cancer research
Rooty Toot Toot-a legendary UPA film also released in 1952
Limited animation

References

External links

Man Alive! at the United States National Library of Medicine
Man Alive on BCDB

1952 films
1952 animated films
1952 short films
1950s short documentary films
American short documentary films
American animated documentary films
Films about cancer
American animated short films
1952 documentary films
UPA films
Films with screenplays by William Roberts (screenwriter)
1950s English-language films
1950s American films